Boychukism (in Ukrainian) is a cultural and artistic phenomenon in the history of Ukrainian art between the 1910s and 1930s, distinguished by its artistic monumental-synthetic style. It was an original school of Ukrainian art, formed by a synthesis of Ukrainian folk art and the church art of Byzantium, Proto-Renaissance and Ukraine. The name comes from the name of the founder of the movement: Mykhailo Boychuk, monumentalist and graphic artist.

Neo-Byzantine art 
European artists of that time such as Pablo Picasso, Alexander Arkhipenko and Kazimir Malevich, differently understood the connections between the spiritual nature of ancient cultures and the language of its plasticity. Byzantinism and the Ukrainian naïve art became artistic landmarks for the Boychukists.

In 1909, Boychuk founded a studio of Neo-Byzantine art in Paris, which became the beginning of his school. The artist sought to revive Ukrainian art on the basis of the best achievements of Byzantium and Kievan Rus' art. Boychukists mastered the technique of wall paintings al fresco and al secco, that is, using respectively wet and dry dyes diluted with wax.

The French called these innovations Renovation Byzantine, later known as the school of Ukrainian monumentalism or Boychukism.

Theory of New Ukrainian Art 

Mykhailo Boychuk sought to reform Ukrainian art and create a new Ukrainian style that was to become truly national and deeply embedded in everyday human life.

The artist proposed a theory of New Ukrainian Art. According to art critics, "the basis of Boychukism is the creation of a national style, which is characterized  by compositional clarity, high plastic culture and excellence". Boychukists developed a "concept of monumental style, in which the ornamental flatness, which is characteristic of Byzantine frescoes, is organically intertwined, with a strict and balanced, rhythmic and color harmony of folk iconography and Ukrainian folk paintings". Their "works are characterized by simplicity of drawing, graceful rhythmicity of compositions, rational arrangement of masses and lines".

Boychukists focused not on the field of easel composition, but on the organization of the human environment and a clear concept of creating national art.

Ukrainian monumentalism 
Over almost ten years, Boychukism's style was formed, from the Parisian Renovation Byzantine to Ukrainian monumentalism. In December 1917, the Ukrainian State Academy of Arts was founded, which housed a school of monumentalism.

Characteristic features of the collective creativity of the Boychukists were the use of tempera instead of oil, a return to the historical heritage, and the use of syncretism of the art form.

In the 1920s, the Boychukists were already developing their own schools: Sofiya Nalepynska-Boychuk and Ivan Padalka in graphics, Vasyl Sedlyar, Oksana Pavlenko and Serhiy Kolos in industrial design, and Hryhoriy Komar in monumental painting.

The Boychukists hoped to use monumentalism to embody the projected ideal model of harmonious life. They created avant-garde art, working on a synthesis of cultural heritage and renewed art form. They turned the everyday life of the Ukrainian village into sacred action.

At the end of 1925, the Association of Revolutionary Art of Ukraine (ARMU) was founded in Kyiv, uniting the Boychukists. ARMU promoted the introduction of art in everyday life, combining it with life, and denied naturalistic realism. The Boychukists aspired to the national identity of Ukrainian art.

Between 1919 and 1935, the Boychukists painted more than a dozen monumental ensemble paintings in Kyiv, Kharkiv, Odessa, and Odessa Oblast. The most significant of them were the decoration of Lutsk barracks in Kyiv (1919), Sanatorium VUTSVK on the Khadzhibey Estuary in Odessa (1928), the House of the Press named after Mykhailo Kotsiubynsky in Odessa (1929–30), and the Chervonozavodsky Theater in Kharkiv (1933–35).

Mezhyhirya Art and Ceramic Technical School 
In 1919, the Mezhyhirya art and ceramic studios (from 1923 a technical school) were located on the territory of the Mezhyhirya monastery, where the Boychukists worked.

In 1923–24, students and teachers of the technical school organized the Revolutionary Puppet Theater ("vertep") under the direction of art critic P. Gorbenko.  Illustrations in the form of engravings were made by students of the woodcut studio of the Kyiv Institute of Art under the guidance of Mykhailo Boychuk's wife Sofiya Nalepynska-Boychuk.

Repressions 
The ideological and artistic principles of the Boychukists did not fit into the canonized framework of "Soviet art" and provoked accusations from the "militant socialists" of distorting the images of the Soviet people and socialist reality.

At the turn of the 1920s and 1930s, the Bolshevik authorities intensified the brutal struggle against "kulak farms" in the Ukrainian countryside. Due to the dominance of the peasant theme in the works of the Boychukists, they were accused of propagating the bourgeois-kulak element, nationalism and formalism.

Bright tendencies in the development of national art in the works of the Boychukists were declared to be deeply hostile to socialist culture. The result of the struggle was the destruction of many Ukrainian artists and their work and of Boychukism in general.

All monumental ensemble paintings of the Boychukists were destroyed. Of all the legacy of Boychukism, only some sketch works have survived.

Exhibitions 
1990 - exhibition "Boychuk and Boychukists, Boychukism" in the Lviv National Art Gallery.

December 7, 2017 - January 28, 2018 - a large-scale exhibition "Boychukism. Great Style 'Project'". The exhibition featured more than 300 paintings, graphics and mosaics by Mykhailo and Tymofiy Boychuk, Vasyl Sedlyar, Ivan Padalka, Sofia Nalepynska, Oksana Pavlenko, Antonina Ivanova, Mykola Rokytsky, Serhiy Kolos, Okhrim Kravchenko. The exhibition considered Boychukism as a holistic artistic direction in the context of contemporary world art trends and studied the evolution of Boychukism for almost 30 years.

Gallery

References

Arts in Ukraine
Ukrainian art
Ukrainian avant-garde